Sapium cuneatum is a species of flowering plant in the family Euphorbiaceae. It is endemic to Jamaica.

References

Hippomaneae
Endemic flora of Jamaica
Taxonomy articles created by Polbot
Taxobox binomials not recognized by IUCN